Yale French Studies is an academic journal published biannually by Yale University Press and connected with the French department at Yale University. It was established in 1948 by editor Robert Greer Cohn, and is currently edited by Alyson Waters. The premier issue was devoted entirely to existentialism. It featured scenes from the play Les mains sales by Jean Paul Sartre and essays by renowned literary scholars.

External links
 Official Web Site at Yale University Press

French studies journals
Biannual journals
English-language journals
Publications established in 1948